Gul Muhammad Chhalgri (Sindhi: ڳوٺ گل محمد ڇلگري) is a community village located at union council Masu Bhurgri of District Hyderabad Sindh province of Pakistan.This Village has Government Boys Primary School Gul Muhammad Chhalgri and Government Girls Primary School Gul Muhammad Chhalgri.

References 

Talukas of Sindh
Populated places in Hyderabad District, Pakistan